Daniel Lewis Lee (January 31, 1973 – July 14, 2020) was an American man convicted and executed by the United States federal government for the murders of William Frederick Mueller, Nancy Ann Mueller, and their daughter, Sarah Elizabeth Powell. In January 1996, Lee and his accomplice, Chevie Kehoe, murdered the family during a robbery at their Arkansas home. Kehoe was found guilty of the triple murder in a separate trial and was sentenced to three consecutive terms of life imprisonment without parole. Lee was sentenced to death.

Upon conviction by the US federal government, Lee stayed on death row for 21 years before he was scheduled to be executed on July 13, 2020, but on that date, a U.S. district judge blocked the execution, citing unresolved legal issues. Thereafter, on July 14, the Supreme Court of the United States ruled that the execution could proceed. It was scheduled for 4:00 a.m. that same day. After another short delay, he was executed at 8:07 a.m. He was the first person executed by the US federal government since 2003.

Early life
Lee was born on January 31, 1973, in Yukon, Oklahoma. He was reportedly abused and neglected as a child.

On July 24, 1990, in Oklahoma City, Lee got into an altercation with another man, Joseph "Joey" Wavra III, at a party. Lee struck Wavra in the face and kicked him on the floor once he had collapsed. He then assisted his cousin, John David Patton, in moving Wavra to a sewer tunnel. Lee took items from Wavra and handed Patton a knife which Patton used to kill him. Lee then assisted in disposing of Wavra's clothes. On December 2, 1990, Lee pleaded guilty to robbery, whereupon the murder charge was dismissed. He received a five-year suspended sentence for his involvement in the crime, while Patton was sentenced to life without parole. Patton died in prison on January 7, 2014.

Lee met white supremacist Chevie Kehoe in 1995 and was recruited into a white supremacist organization known as the Aryan Peoples' Republic or the Aryan Peoples' Resistance (APR). On May 3, 1995, Lee was convicted of carrying a concealed weapon and was sentenced to six months probation.

Lee lost his left eye sometime before April 1996 when he was hit by a cue ball in a bar fight in Spokane, Washington, after he called a Native American a racial slur. He refused to wear an eyepatch and among his neo-Nazi skinhead friends gained a nickname Cy, short for Cyclops.

Mueller family murders
In January 1996, Lee and Kehoe left the state of Washington and traveled to Arkansas. On January 11, 1996, they arrived at the home of William Frederick Mueller, a gun dealer who lived near Tilly, Arkansas who possessed a large collection of weapons, ammunition, and cash. Kehoe and his father had robbed Mueller in February 1995, and Kehoe expected to find valuable property at the house. Dressed in police raid clothing, Lee and Kehoe tried to enter Mueller's home, but the family was not in. When they returned, Lee and Kehoe overpowered and incapacitated Mueller and his wife, Nancy Ann Mueller (née Branch). They then questioned Nancy Mueller's 8-year-old daughter, Sarah Elizabeth Powell, about where they could find the cash, guns, and ammunition, forcing her to talk by shocking her with an electric cattle prod. After finding $50,000 in cash and gold, and $30,000 worth of firearms and firearm parts, they shot each of the three victims with a stun gun. They then placed plastic bags over their heads and sealed the bags with duct tape, suffocating them to death. Lee received $3,000 or $4,000 and a pistol for his part in the crime. The bodies were discovered in Lake Dardanelle near Russellville, Arkansas in late June 1996.

Kehoe and his family took the stolen property to a motel in Spokane, Washington, by way of the Christian Identity community of Elohim City, Oklahoma. On June 17, 1997, Kehoe was arrested in Cedar City, Utah.

Sentencing and execution

The Mueller family murders were a federal crime since they had been committed to support a racketeering enterprise. Prosecutors sought death sentences for both Kehoe and Lee.

When Kehoe was sentenced to life imprisonment, federal prosecutors initially planned to pursue a similar sentence of life imprisonment for accomplice Daniel Lewis Lee, but were directed by the United States Department of Justice in Washington, D.C. to argue for a death sentence. U.S. Attorney Paula Casey requested U.S. Attorney General Janet Reno withdraw jeopardy of capital punishment but was told by Deputy U.S. Attorney General Eric Holder to continue seeking a death sentence. On May 4, 1999, Lee received a death sentence for three counts of murder in aid of racketeering after the prosecution pointed to his previous convictions as evidence that he was a future danger to society. The mother of Nancy Mueller, Earlene Branch Peterson, pleaded for clemency on behalf of Lee. She stated, "I can't see how executing Daniel Lee will honor my daughter in any way. In fact, it's kinda like it dirties her name. Because she wouldn't want it and I don't want it."

In December 1999, the United States Court of Appeals for the Eighth Circuit issued a writ of mandamus quashing Lee's subpoenas of Reno and Holder regarding the sentencing decision. In March 2000, District Judge Garnett Thomas Eisele granted Lee's motion for a new penalty phase trial if the Attorney General herself decided not to withdraw the death penalty. In December 2001, that judgment was reversed by the Eighth Circuit, which reinstated Lee's death sentence. In July 2004, the Eighth Circuit affirmed Lee's conviction and death sentence on the merits.

In April 2013, the Eighth Circuit affirmed the denial of Lee's habeas corpus petition challenging the constitutionality of his conviction. In July 2015, the Eighth Circuit affirmed the denial of Lee's subsequent habeas motion challenging the constitutionality of his prior habeas motion. Lee was scheduled to be executed on December 9, 2019, and would have been the first inmate to be executed by the federal government since the execution of Louis Jones Jr. in 2003. On November 20, 2019, U.S. District Judge Tanya S. Chutkan issued a preliminary injunction preventing the resumption of federal executions. Lee and the other three plaintiffs in the case argued that the use of pentobarbital may violate the Federal Death Penalty Act of 1994.

On December 5, 2019, an Indiana federal court stayed Lee's execution, but the United States Court of Appeals for the Seventh Circuit vacated the Indiana federal court's stay of execution on December 6, 2019. Later that same day, the Supreme Court of the United States denied a stay of Chutkan's injunction against all federal executions while the U.S. Court of Appeals reviews Chutkan's decision.

In April 2020, a panel of the United States Court of Appeals for the District of Columbia Circuit vacated District Judge Chutkan's injunction in a per curiam decision. Circuit Judges Gregory G. Katsas and Neomi Rao both wrote concurring opinions concluding that Lee may be executed, but for different reasons. Circuit Judge David S. Tatel dissented, arguing that the statute explicitly requires the federal government to follow state execution protocols. On June 29, 2020, the Supreme Court denied Lee's petition for a writ of certiorari, with Justices  Ruth Bader Ginsburg and Sonia Sotomayor dissenting.

The execution date was set for July 13, 2020, the first of several federal executions scheduled after the D.C. Circuit's ruling. The victims' families asked for a rescheduling of the date, saying they were unable to travel to witness the execution due to the COVID-19 pandemic in the United States, but the Seventh Circuit ruled that while allowing the victims' families to attend such events is standard practice, there are no rights or legal basis for their attendance, and denied a change in date. The victims' families sent an emergency appeal to the Supreme Court. Before the Supreme Court could rule, Judge Chutkan ordered a halt to all federal executions on the basis that the process was "very likely to cause extreme pain and needless suffering". The Department of Justice appealed to both the Court of Appeals for the D.C. Circuit and the Supreme Court. The D.C. Circuit Court did not intervene. In the early morning of July 14, 2020, the Supreme Court lifted the hold that Judge Chutkan previously implemented in a 5–4 decision. This action allowed the Department of Justice to proceed with the execution; Lee's lawyers said that the execution could not go forward after midnight under federal regulations.

Lee was executed later that morning. When asked for a final statement, he denied committing the crime, stating, "I didn't do it. I've made a lot of mistakes in my life, but I'm not a murderer. You're killing an innocent man", and that he and Kehoe had been in a different part of the country when the crime occurred. Lee was pronounced dead at 8:07 a.m. after receiving a single-dose lethal injection of pentobarbital.

Lee was the first person to be executed by the United States federal government since the execution of Louis Jones Jr. in 2003. Overall, his execution was the fourth federal execution since legislation permitting the resumption of the practice was passed in 1988.

Media
The Discovery Channel's docudrama series The FBI Files reenacts the behavior of Kehoe and Lee while also showing the forensic science used by the FBI to arrest them in season 2, episode 16, "Deadly Mission", originally aired: 2000.

See also
 Capital punishment by the United States federal government
 List of people executed by the United States federal government
 List of people executed in the United States in 2020

References

1973 births
2020 deaths
20th-century American criminals
American people executed for murder
Executed people from Oklahoma
People convicted of murder by the United States federal government
People executed by the United States federal government by lethal injection
21st-century executions by the United States federal government
People from Yukon, Oklahoma
American neo-Nazis